Colos is a Portuguese parish in the municipality of Odemira. The population in 2011 was 1,061, in an area of 109.77 km2.

References

Freguesias of Odemira